The generalized second-price auction (GSP) is a non-truthful auction mechanism for multiple items. Each bidder places a bid. The highest bidder gets the first slot, the second-highest, the second slot and so on, but the highest bidder pays the price bid by the second-highest bidder, the second-highest pays the price bid by the third-highest, and so on. First conceived as a natural extension of the Vickrey auction, it conserves some of the desirable properties of the Vickrey auction. It is used mainly in the context of keyword auctions, where sponsored search slots are sold on an auction basis. The first analyses of GSP are in the economics literature by Edelman, Ostrovsky, and Schwarz and by Varian. It is used by Google's AdWords technology, and it was employed by Facebook, which has now switched to Vickrey–Clarke–Groves auction.

Formal model 

Suppose that there are  bidders and  slots. We can assume that top slots have a larger probability of being clicked, so:

 

Now, each bidder submits a bid   indicating the maximum they are willing to pay for a slot. Each bidder also has an intrinsic value for buying a slot . Notice that a player's bid   doesn't need to be the same as their true valuation .  
We order the bidders by their bid, let's say:

 

and charge each bidder a price . The price will be 0 if they didn't win a slot. Slots are sold in a pay-per-click model, so a bidder just pays for a slot if the user actually clicks in that slot. The total social welfare from owning or selling all slots is given by:  The expected total revenue is given by:

GSP mechanism 

To specify a mechanism we need to define the allocation rule (who gets which slot) and the prices paid by each bidder. In a generalized second-price auction we order the bidders by their bid and give the top slot to the highest bidder, the second top slot to the second highest bidder and so on. Each bidder winning a slot pays the bid of the next highest bidder, so: .

Non-truthfulness 

There are cases where bidding the true valuation is not a Nash equilibrium.
,  and  respectively.

Equilibria of GSP 

Edelman, Ostrovsky and Schwarz, working under complete information, show that GSP (in the model presented above) always has an efficient locally-envy free equilibrium, i.e., an equilibrium maximizing social welfare, which is measured as  where bidder  is allocated slot  according to the decreasing bid vector . Further, the expected total revenue in any locally-envy free equilibrium is at least as high as in the (truthful) VCG outcome.

Dütting et al. and Lucier at al. prove  that any Nash equilibrium extracts at least one half of the truthful VCG revenue from all slots but the first. Computational analysis of this game have been performed by Thompson and Leyton-Brown.

GSP and uncertainty 

The classical results due to Edelman, Ostrovsky and Schwarz  and Varian  hold in the full information setting – when there is no uncertainty involved. Recent results as Gomes and Sweeney  and Caragiannis et al. and also empirically by Athey and Nekipelov  discuss the Bayesian version of the game - where players have beliefs about the other players but do not necessarily know the other players' valuations.

Gomes and Sweeney  prove that an efficient equilibrium might not exist in the partial information setting. Caragiannis et al. consider the welfare loss at Bayes–Nash equilibrium and prove a price of anarchy bound of 2.927. Bounds on the revenue in Bayes–Nash equilibrium are given by Lucier et al. and Caragiannis et al.

Budget constraints 

The effect of budget constraints in the sponsored search or position auction model is discussed in Ashlagi et al. and in the more general assignment problem by Aggarwal et al. and Dütting et al.

See also
 Vickrey–Clarke–Groves auction
 Generalized first-price auction
 Google Ads
 Auction theory
 Japanese auction

References 

 S. Lahaie, D. Pennock, A. Saberi, and R. Vohra. Algorithmic Game Theory, chapter "Sponsored search auctions", pages 699–716. Cambridge University Press, 2007
 Lecture notes on Keyword-Based Advertisement

Types of auction